Antwane L. Wells Jr. (born April 2, 2001) is an American football wide receiver for the South Carolina Gamecocks.

Early years
Wells Jr. attended Highland Springs High School in Highland Springs, Virginia. As a senior, he had 36 catches for 880 yards and 12 touchdowns. He spent one year at Fork Union Military Academy, before committing to play college football at James Madison University.

College career
As a freshman at James Madison in 2020, Wells Jr. played in all eight games with four starts and had a team leading 33 receptions for 603 yards with six touchdowns. As a sophomore in 2021, he started all 14 games and had 83 receptions for a school record 1,250 yards and 15 touchdowns.

Prior to the 2022 season, Wells Jr. transferred to the University of South Carolina. He became a starter his first year with the team.

References

External links
South Carolina Gamecocks bio

2001 births
Living people
Players of American football from Virginia
American football wide receivers
James Madison Dukes football players
South Carolina Gamecocks football players